Fury were a thrash metal band formed in Broken Hill, Australia in 1993 and for a time were based in Adelaide, Australia. Due to talks with their record label, Fury became known as The Harrowed in Europe, although they retained their original moniker of Fury within Australia. The group's former guitarist, Ricky Boon, is blind due to the degenerative eye condition Retinitis Pigmentosa. His cousin is "Lord Tim" Grose frontman and band leader of Lord and previously the now defunct Dungeon. They had released several tracks on American compilation albums for Dwell Records, recording covers for Megadeth, Suicidal Tendencies, Death and King Diamond tribute albums. The band is currently on an indefinite hiatus whilst members Ricky Boon, Mick O'Neil and Tim Hinton focus on a new project.

History 

Fury issued a four-track extended play, Stigmatised, in 2000. A reviewer from Metal Fanatix rated it at 71 out of 100 and explained, "they incorporate death metal and hardcore influences, and it makes their music almost like a deathcore band... The songs are good on this four song MCD, but they seem to lack direction. They have some good riffs but they seem to not be carried out to their full potential."

The Metal Fanatix reviewer described their second album, Slavekind, as "Like their previous music it is straight ahead thrash somewhere between the sounds of Pantera and Scatterbrain. At times this disk gets you going like a sixteen piston engine and at others like a banging door in a breeze... these guys are playing what they want, and not being distracted into something they can't relate to."

Members 

Ricky Boon - guitar
Darren McLennan - guitar
Tim Hinton - drums
Daniel Wall - bass
Mick O'Neil - vocals
Aaron Dewsbery - bass
Ben Harris - drums
Derek Beauchamp - drums
Steve Comacchio - bass
Chad Cosgrove - vocals

Discography

Albums 

Fury (1997)
Slavekind (2001, re-released in 2003)
Forbidden Art (2005)
 The Harrowed (by The Harrowed) (re-release of Forbidden Art via Massacre Records, 2007)
Forgotten Lore (2010)
Contagion (2010)
Transfiguration (2011)

Extended plays 

Stigmatized (2000)
Blood, Sweat and Iron (2005)

Video albums 

DVD Video Promo (DVD, 2011)

References

External links
 Official Website
 The Harrowed Official Website
  New band website

Australian heavy metal musical groups
Musical groups from Adelaide
Musical groups established in 1993
Musical groups disestablished in 2011
Musical quintets
1993 establishments in Australia